A sourcebook is a collection of writings on a subject that is intended to be a basic introduction to the topic presented.

Academic use
In American universities, a sourcebook, either a standard one or a custom collection, may function as a supplement or replacement for a textbook.

In American law schools, casebooks are similar to sourcebooks, offering selections of legal cases and commentary, forming the basis for analysis and discussion.

Games
In games, a sourcebook is a publication intended to supplement the core materials of a gaming product.  Sourcebooks are most commonly used to complement role-playing games and some tabletop or wargaming series, and often contain optional rules, scenarios, or other materials that players can use to extend or enhance the central game.  The term tends to refer to an overall expansion, while the related splatbook focuses on a specific fictional aspect of the game in depth.

Popular gaming series with many sourcebooks include:
 GURPS
 BattleTech
 Dungeons & Dragons
 Shadowrun

Examples

The regulations of the Financial Services Authority. The FSA Handbook contains many sourcebooks for different aspects of its regulation, for instance its rules on conduct of business for investment firms, the Conduct of Business Sourcebook ('COBS')
Paul Halsall, editor The Internet History Sourcebooks Project
Norton Critical Editions

Notes

See also
 Source literature

External links
Hjørland, Birger (ed.). Source literature Core Concepts in Library and Information Science.

Game terminology
Library science